Aa rosei is a species of orchid in the genus Aa. It is endemic to Peru.

References

rosei
Plants described in 1921
Endemic flora of Peru